90 is the debut album of Korean rock band South Club. They released their first single, "Hug Me" on May 26, 2017, which was then followed by their studio album released on June 27, 2017 under the record label South Buyers Club. The album was mainly composed and produced by Nam Tae-hyun, who is also the leader of the band.

Background and release 
On June 22, 2017, Nam uploaded a teaser of the album cover and also announced the release date of the album, With double title tracks "I Got the blues" and "Liar".

Track listing

Release history

References

2017 debut albums
2017 EPs
Blues rock EPs
South Club albums